Super Heavy Organ is an album by New Orleans and San Diego keyboardist Robert Walter.

Musicians 
 Robert Walter - Hammond organ, piano, clavinet, melodica, percussion
 Johnny Vidacovich - drums
 Stanton Moore - drums
 Tim Green - tenor saxophone
 James Singleton - bass
 Anthony Farrell (special guest) - vocals

Track listing 
 "Adelita"
 "Kickin' Up the Dust"
 "Spell"
 "El Cuervo"
 "Criminals Have a Name for It"
 "34 Small"
 "Don't Hate, Congratulate"
 "Poor Tom"
 "Dad's Drunk Again"
 "Big Dummy"
 "Hardware"
 "Cabrillo"

References 

Liner Notes

2005 albums
Robert Walter (musician) albums
Jazz-funk albums